Sean O'Loughlin  (born 24 November 1982) is an English former professional rugby league footballer who played as a loose forward for and captained the Wigan Warriors in the Super League, and has also played for Great Britain and England at international level. 

O'Loughlin made his senior debut for Wigan in 2002, and has captained the side since 2006. He has played his entire club career with Wigan, making over 450 appearances, and winning four Grand Finals, two Challenge Cups and one World Club Challenge with the club. He has been named in the Super League Dream Team on seven occasions, including five consecutive seasons between 2010 and 2014.

O'Loughlin made his international debut in 2004, and went on to earn 11 caps for Great Britain, and an additional 25 caps for England. He was named as England captain in 2014, and has appeared for the team in two World Cups (2013 and 2017).

Background
Sean O'Loughlin was born 24 November 1982 in Wigan, Greater Manchester, England.

O'Loughlin's dad, Keiron, and uncle, Kevin, both played more than 250 games for Wigan in the 1970s. His father Keiron O'Loughlin also featured in the 1983–84 Challenge Cup Final for the Widnes side which achieved victory over Wigan. It was the Wigan-based amateur club Wigan St Patricks which gave Sean his first experience of competitive rugby league. He had already gained international experience as part of the 2001 Great Britain Academy of Australia, a product of the Wigan academy, for whom he started playing in under-19s matches in 2001, and continued to do so in 2002.

Because of this, O'Loughlin remains one of only a handful of rugby league players ever to play at Twickenham, the home of English rugby union, along with those in the St. Helens, Bradford Bulls and Huddersfield teams who competed in the 2001 and 2006 Challenge Cup finals.
He is the Uncle of current England rugby union captain Owen Farrell, and the Brother-in-Law of current rugby union coach Andy Farrell.

Club career

2000s 

O'Loughlin made his breakthrough into the Wigan first team under head coach Stuart Raper during 2002's Super League VII. His first experience in the first team came as a substitute wearing jersey No. 22 during Wigan's 18–20 home defeat by Hull F.C. Two weeks later, O'Loughlin scored his first tries for the club as a substitute against Warrington, and subsequently made six consecutive appearances from the bench. He made his first starting appearance for Wigan during a 16–41 away victory against Warrington, when he was called upon to replace his injured brother-in-law, Andy Farrell.

He also started, and scored a try, at  against Leeds. O'Loughlin's first season mostly saw him come into the match as an interchange, starting in only five of the twenty-one appearances he made throughout the league season. Also in 2002 he was named as captain of the England A squad that faced New Zealand in November and later toured Fiji and Tonga. He made 3 appearances on the tour and was sent off and sin-binned in the same match against Fiji. He was named captain of the 2003 England A squad to face Australia and in the European Nations Cup. He also gained his first senior representative honour when he represented Lancashire in the 2003 Origin match. 

O'Loughlin played for the Wigan Warriors at stand-off half back in the 2003 Super League Grand Final which was lost to Bradford Bulls.
During the season he earned a new contract and a call up to the Great Britain squad for the first time for the 2004 Tri-Nations series. He made his début off the bench against Australia, and his first starting appearance in the following match against New Zealand.

After making an impressive start to the 2005 season, he suffered a serious knee injury in the Good Friday derby against St Helens, ruling him out for the rest of the season. He returned to the first team in 2006 and was announced as captain by coach Ian Millward. The poor start to the season left Wigan bottom of the Super League and led to the sacking of Ian Millward who was replaced by Brian Noble. 

O'Loughlin showed a dramatic improvement under Noble. His performance in 2006 earned him a recall into the Great Britain squad for the mid season international with New Zealand at Knowsley Road, St. Helens which Great Britain won. Also at the end of season he was selected in the squad for the 2006 Tri-Nations in Australia, playing in Great Britain's opening defeat by New Zealand but playing an important role in Great Britain's victory over Australia. He missed Great Britain's 34–4 defeat by New Zealand with a muscle strain.

With O'Loughlin's contract expiring at the end of 2006 he was linked with a move to new Australian NRL side Gold Coast Titans for most of the season but in November 2006 he signed a new two deal with Wigan keeping him at the club until 2008. O'Loughlin was forced to rule himself out of contention for the England training squad for the 2008 Rugby League World Cup through injury. Likewise he was forced to withdraw from the 2009 Four Nations England squad before the start of the series.

2010s 

The 2010 season saw O'Loughlin noted for his hard work rate, topping most if not all stats. He has been the player of the month twice in 2010 and been in the Super League dream team a record 7 times in total (up to 2018). He was selected to play for England against France in the one-off test. 

He played in the 2010 Super League Grand Final victory over St. Helens at Old Trafford.

He made his 300th appearance for Wigan in the opening game of the 2013 season against Salford. O'Loughlin led Wigan to the double, with a 16–0 Challenge Cup Final win over Hull F.C. at Wembley Stadium, and the 2013 Super League Grand Final 30–16 comeback victory over Warrington Wolves at Old Trafford.

He played in the 2014 Super League Grand Final defeat by St Helens at Old Trafford.

He played in the 2015 Super League Grand Final defeat by Leeds Rhinos and the 2016 Super League Grand Final victory over the Warrington Wolves, both at Old Trafford.

In 2016, O'Loughlin was sent off for the first time in his career for a high tackle on Wakefield's Chris Annakin. He was subsequently given a one-match ban by the disciplinary tribunal.

He played in the 2017 Challenge Cup Final defeat by Hull F.C. at Wembley Stadium.

He played in the 2018 Super League Grand Final victory over Warrington at Old Trafford.

In November 2019, O'Loughlin signed a new one-year contract with the club, and announced that he would be retiring at the end of the 2020 season.

On 13 November 2020, O'Loughlin confirmed that he would be retiring at the end of the 2020 Super League season, bringing his 19-year career to an end.

His final game before retirement was the 2020 Super League Grand Final which Wigan lost 8-4 against St Helens.

International career

O'Loughlin played for England in the 2013 Rugby League World Cup. The following year, following the international retirement of Kevin Sinfield, he was named as England captain ahead of the Four Nations tournament.

In 2015 he was named the captain of England's squad for the end-of-year test series against New Zealand. Beforehand there was a test match where England took on France. Sean O'Loughlin was the captain of the team that went on to demolish Les Tricolores. O'Loughlin scored tries in the first match of the New Zealand test-match series in Hull and the decisive third match in Wigan. He was an influential captain throughout the series, leading his side to England's first series victory in 8 years. His influential performance also resulted him in winning the George Smith Medal as player of the series.

In October 2017 he was selected in the England squad for the 2017 Rugby League World Cup.

Career statistics

Honours
O'Loughlin was appointed Officer of the Order of the British Empire (OBE) in the 2022 Birthday Honours for services to rugby league football.

 Super League
 Winners (4): 2010, 2013, 2016, 2018
 League Leaders' Shield
 Winners (3): 2010, 2012, 2020
 Challenge Cup
 Winners (2): 2011, 2013
 World Club Challenge
 Winners (1): 2017

References

External links

 ĎŔƑ "My life in rugby league: Sean O'Loughlin" interview at TotalRL.com
Wigan Warriors profile
Statistics at wigan.rlfans.com
SL profile
Statistics at rlwc2017.com

1982 births
Living people
England national rugby league team captains
England national rugby league team players
English people of Irish descent
English rugby league players
English rugby union players
Farrell family
Great Britain national rugby league team players
Lancashire rugby league team players
Officers of the Order of the British Empire
Rugby league locks
Rugby league players from Wigan
Rugby league second-rows
Rugby union players from Wigan
Wigan St Patricks players
Wigan Warriors captains
Wigan Warriors players